Mojo Records was a California-based record label founded in 1995 by producer Jay Rifkin. It became a joint venture with Universal Records in 1996 and then sold to the Zomba Group in 2001, who placed it under their subsidiary Jive Records. The label has been largely inactive since Zomba was purchased and restructured under BMG in 2003, save for a few reissues of older material.

Artists and albums
Admiral Twin (alternative rock)
Mock Heroic (2000)
Amorphis
Far from the Sun (2003)
Cherry Poppin' Daddies (rock/ska/swing)
Zoot Suit Riot (1997)
Soul Caddy (2000)
The Ernies (alternative rock/ska punk)
Meson Ray (1999)
Factory 81 (nu metal)
Mankind (1999)
Goldfinger (ska punk/pop punk)
Goldfinger (1996)
Stomping Ground (2000)
Foot in Mouth (2001)
Open Your Eyes (2002)
Best of Goldfinger (2005)
Pilfers (ska/rock)
Chawalaleng (1999)
Plastiscene (Britpop/Rock)
Plastiscene EP (1997)
Seeing Stars (1998)
Reel Big Fish (ska punk)
Turn the Radio Off (1996)
Why Do They Rock So Hard? (1998)
Cheer Up! (2002)
Favorite Noise (2002)
We're Not Happy 'Til You're Not Happy (2005)
Weston (pop punk)
The Massed Albert Sounds (2000)
White Hot Odyssey (glam rock)
White Hot Odyssey (2004)

See also 
 List of record labels

References

Defunct record labels of the United States
Alternative rock record labels
Record labels based in California
Zomba Group of Companies subsidiaries